Drummully or Drumully ("rocky ridge") is an electoral division (ED) in the west of County Monaghan in Ireland. Known as the Sixteen Townlands to locals and as Coleman's Island or the Clonoony salient to the security forces, it is a pene-enclave almost completely surrounded by County Fermanagh in Northern Ireland. Since the Partition of Ireland in the 1920s, the Monaghan–Fermanagh border has formed part of the international border between the Republic of Ireland and the United Kingdom, leaving Drummully as a practical enclave, connected to the rest of what is now the Republic of Ireland only by an unbridged  length of the  Finn River. The area is accessed via the Clones–Butlersbridge road, numbered N54 in the Republic and A3 in Northern Ireland.

The civil parish of Drummully includes the Monaghan ED and the surrounding parts of Fermanagh; the townland of Drummully, with the ruins of the medieval parish church, lies in the Fermanagh portion of the parish.  The two county Fermanagh EDs separating Drummully from the republic are Clonkeelan to the east and Derrysteaton to the southwest. The Connons is a name given sometimes to Drummully ED, and sometimes to the entire district between Clones and Redhills, County Cavan, encompassing Clonkeelan, Drummully, and Derrysteaton. Connons Catholic church and Connons community hall are in Drummully ED.

History 
The area's unusual border was ascribed in the 1920s to "some long forgotten feud between petty kings". Drummully ED lies in the province of Ulster near the tripoint of three counties, Monaghan, Fermanagh, and Cavan, which were created in the 1580s from three medieval Gaelic lordships: respectively Airgíalla (McMahon's country), Fear Manach (Maguire's country) and East Breifne (O'Reilly's country). These lordships had been divided into , subdivided into  ("ballybetaghs") and "tates". The Mac Domhnaill were gradually concentrated in the ballybetagh of Ballyconinsi, whose extent corresponds with that of Drummully ED. "Hound Island" is the origin of [the] Connons and Ballyconinsi ( + ); according to Nollaig Ó Muraíle, it is unclear precisely where the island is or was; John O'Donovan said in 1848 that it was a townland "now divided into several sub-denominations". Most of the 16 townlands now in the Drummully ED can be identified among the 16 tates listed in the ballybetagh of Ballyconinsi in records of 1591, 1606, and 1610.

The Tudor conquest of Ireland proceeded by surrender and regrant, whereby a Gaelic lord would surrender sovereignty to the English monarch as monarch of Ireland, and be regranted title to the land under common law. The 1580s shiring of Ulster proceeded on that basis, with McMahon's country becoming County Monaghan, within which Dartraighe became the barony of Dartree; likewise Clann Ceallaigh became Clankelly barony in County Fermanagh. Ballyconinsi was shired with the McMahons rather than their enemies the Maguires. Most of the Gaelic proprietors in these counties forfeited their lands after the Nine Years' War or the Rebellion of 1641. In 1640, most of Ballyconinsi was owned by one Jacob Leirrey, with small tracts retaining Gaelic owners.

Until 1836, a change to the 1580s boundaries would have required an Act of the Irish Parliament (to 1800) or the UK Parliament (1801–1922). While the Valuation of Lands (Ireland) Act 1836 facilitated transfer of exclaves (as of Gubdoo from Dartree to Coole, County Fermanagh in 1842) it did not apply to pene-exclaves. EDs were introduced with the Irish Poor Law Act of 1838 for elections to the boards of guardians of the new Poor Law Unions (PLUs); Drummully ED was within Clones PLU and initially included most of the parish of Drummully, but in 1877 it was redrawn with its current boundaries. The Local Government Board for Ireland was empowered to adapt county boundaries for the Local Government (Ireland) Act 1898, but it left Drummully unchanged. Drummully ED was last used as an electoral area in the 1914 election to Clones No. 1 rural district council. The Local Government (Ireland) Act 1919 mandated the single transferable vote, which needed multi-seat local electoral areas (LEAs) formed by combining single-seat EDs. Since then, EDs have no independent uses but remain legally defined areas used as references for specifying the makeup of larger units, or the location of smaller ones.

The Government of Ireland Act 1920 attempted to answer the "Irish question" within the United Kingdom of Great Britain and Ireland, by grouping the counties into separate home rule jurisdictions of Northern Ireland and Southern Ireland, with Fermanagh in the former and Monaghan in the latter. Irish republican opposition saw the 1920 act superseded by the 1921 Anglo-Irish Treaty, with Southern Ireland being replaced by a dominion called the Irish Free State and the provisional border with Northern Ireland subject to change by an Irish Boundary Commission. Protestant unionists owned most of the land in Drummully but were a minority of the population. Submissions to the boundary commission from unionists (including Fermanagh County Council and the Church of Ireland parish of Drummully) proposed to resolve the inconvenience of the locality's sinuous border by transferring Drummully ED to Northern Ireland, while those from nationalists (including Clones urban district council and the Free State government) proposed transferring all, or at least adjoining parts, of Fermanagh to the Free State. Nationalist and unionist locals both submitted that they would rather the area were entirely on the "wrong" side of the border than preserve the status quo. The Clones–Butlersbridge road, the Ulster Canal, and the railway line between Clones and Redhills would each have been entirely south of the border instead of crossing it four times (the canal forming the border for several hundred yards). However, the report as a whole proved so controversial that publication was suppressed and it was never implemented.

Drummully was inaccessible by road except through the United Kingdom. It was not policed until May 1924 when the Garda Síochána were allowed to pass through Northern Ireland, by which time poteen making was rife. The Church of Ireland parish of Drummully had its rectory in the north and its church in the south; for some years after partition, marriages solemnised there were not registered with the Dublin authorities. There were customs posts at the main Irish border crossings, but none around Drummully: the N54/A3 was a "concession road" such that journeys beginning and ending in the same jurisdiction did not require any border formalities, while the other crossings were "unapproved roads" where spot checks on traffic might confiscate transported goods presumed to be smuggled. The border runs down the middle of a minor road in the north of Drummully. The Royal Ulster Constabulary during the IRA "border campaign" of the 1950s, and the British Army from 1971 during the Troubles, blocked the unapproved roads into Drummully with reinforced concrete blocks, metal spikes and craters, to prevent the area being used as a redoubt by Irish republican paramilitaries. The Dublin government gave the British military permission, renewed annually, to overfly the area "to facilitate the transport of men and materials, the evacuation of casualties and, in particular, the shadowing of suspect vehicles". Irish security forces were not permitted to travel through Northern Ireland in uniform, and "[t]he only route for armed gardai or army would appear to be by helicopter", using the Irish Air Corps helicopter based at Monaghan town. Local TD Jimmy Leonard complained in 1974 of concomitant lawlessness, while in 1980 there were fears that the Air Corps helicopter might be shot down by republicans mistaking it for an RAF aircraft.  These blockages were removed by the 1990s peace process. Since then, the post-1992 European Single Market and the post-1952 Common Travel Area between Ireland and the UK have made the border "invisible". Nevertheless, when 2010 budget cuts deprived Clones Garda station of its unmarked car, officers could no longer drive to Drummully.

The prospect of Brexit has uncertain impact on the border; an "Irish backstop" to preserve an invisible border was included in the November 2018 Brexit withdrawal agreement which the UK parliament rejected in 2019; the October 2019 agreement includes a similar arrangement, subject to ratification by Westminster, subsequent EU–UK implementation agreements, and possible future termination by cross-community vote of the Northern Ireland Assembly. International coverage of Brexit has often mentioned Drummully as a place especially sensitive to these issues.

Statistics

Footnotes

Sources
 ; reprinted in

Citations

Further reading

External links
 Census 2016: Drummully — Small Area Population Statistics from Central Statistics Office
 Geohive map centred on Drummully – zoomable and with historical layers from Ordnance Survey Ireland

Clones, County Monaghan
Enclaves and exclaves
Republic of Ireland–United Kingdom border crossings